Bignell Creek is a tributary of the Adolphe-Poisson Bay located on the southwestern side of the Gouin Reservoir. This stream runs entirely in forest zone in the town of La Tuque, in the administrative region of Mauricie, in Quebec, in Canada.

Bignell stream flows successively into the Provancher and Poisson townships.

Forestry is the main economic activity of this valley; recreational tourism activities, second.

A secondary forest road will loosen the western part of the Bignell Creek valley. The route 404, connecting the village of Clova, Quebec to the South Bay of Bureau Lake (Gouin Reservoir) serves the south of Lac Duchamp and the West of Tessier Lake (Gouin Reservoir); this road connects to the south-east the route 400 which goes to Gouin Dam. Some secondary forest roads are in use at proximity to forestry and recreational tourism activities.

The surface of Bignell Brook is usually frozen from mid-November to the end of April, however, safe ice circulation is generally from early December to late March.

Geography

Toponymy 
The term "Bignell" refers to a family name of English origin.

The toponym "ruisseau Bignell" was formalized on December 5, 1968 at the Commission de toponymie du Québec, when it was created.

Notes and references

See also 

Rivers of Mauricie
Tributaries of the Saint-Maurice River
La Tuque, Quebec